Familiar to Millions is a live album by English rock band Oasis. It was released on 13 November 2000 by Big Brother Recordings. The album was recorded at Wembley Stadium on 22 July 2000. It debuted at No. 5 in the UK charts with 57,000 copies sold in the first week. To date Familiar to Millions has sold around 310,000 copies in Britain alone (Platinum), about 70,000 copies in the United States and an estimated 1 million copies worldwide. The album was initially released simultaneously on six formats: DVD, VHS, double CD, double cassette, triple vinyl, and double MiniDisc.

Track listing
All songs written by Noel Gallagher, except where noted. The disc division and track lengths below are taken from the double-CD edition of the album.

Disc one
 "Fuckin' in the Bushes" (intro tape) – 3:04
 "Go Let It Out" – 5:32
 "Who Feels Love?" – 5:59
 "Supersonic" – 4:30
 "Shakermaker" – 5:13
 "Acquiesce" – 4:18
 "Step Out" (Gallagher, Stevie Wonder, Henry Cosby, Sylvia Moy) – 4:05
 "Gas Panic!" – 8:01
 "Roll with It" – 4:43
 "Stand by Me" – 5:49

Disc two
 "Wonderwall" – 4:34
 "Cigarettes & Alcohol" – 6:53
 "Don't Look Back in Anger" – 5:09
 "Live Forever" – 4:52
 "Hey Hey, My My (Into the Black)" (Neil Young, Jeff Blackburn) – 3:45
 "Champagne Supernova" – 6:31
 "Rock 'n' Roll Star" – 6:19
 "Helter Skelter" (John Lennon, Paul McCartney) – 6:32

The 'Highlights' Version
(This version is on one CD. All songs are written by Noel Gallagher.)

 "Go Let It Out" – 5:51
 "Who Feels Love?" – 6:00
 "Supersonic" – 4:30
 "Shakermaker" – 5:13
 "Acquiesce" – 4:07
 "Gas Panic!" – 8:02
 "Roll with It" – 4:44
 "Wonderwall" – 4:34
 "Cigarettes & Alcohol" – 6:53
 "Don't Look Back in Anger" – 5:09
 "Live Forever" – 4:53
 "Champagne Supernova" – 6:31
 "Rock 'n' Roll Star" – 6:24

Video version (DVD/VHS/VCD)
As well as the first night, the DVD features the following:
 45-minute documentary directed by Dick Carruthers was shot in and around Wembley by Grant Gee including backstage interviews and fans footage.
 Multi-camera angles on the track "Cigarettes & Alcohol".
 Live screen films for "Go Let It Out", "Supersonic", "Live Forever" and "Rock 'n' Roll Star".
 Complete Discography (inc. international releases) with audio clips and artwork.
 PCM 2.0 Stereo Sound.
 Dolby Digital 5.0 Surround Sound.
 CD-ROM element, which links to an exclusive page on the Oasis website with as-yet unseen photos and Songplayer module where fans can teach themselves to play "Live Forever".
 'Tambourine' icon: click it and it takes you to and from the documentary in real time.

The UK VHS features the whole show and a 20-minute documentary (entitled "Mad Fer It") featuring exclusive interviews with Liam and Noel Gallagher. This documentary is unique to the VHS format.

Audio version (CD/Vinyl/Cassette/MiniDisc)
 The CD features an extra bonus track, a cover of The Beatles' song "Helter Skelter", which was recorded at the Riverside Theatre, Milwaukee, WI, USA on 16 April 2000.
 A highlights CD was released on 1 October 2001 to celebrate Oasis' tenth anniversary as a band. "Fuckin' in the Bushes", "Step Out", "Stand by Me", "Hey Hey, My My", and "Helter Skelter" were all omitted.
 As Liam let the audience sing the choruses of "Wonderwall" and also changed the words to other parts of the song ("By now you should have somehow realised not to sniff glue" / "And all the lights that light the way are doin' me fuckin' 'ead in!") at the 22 July gig, the version on the various audio formats features a different vocal track to the original one recorded at Wembley. This also applies to Noel's backing vocals. Most of these overdubbed vocals were recorded at Oasis' gig at the Yokohama Arena, Kanagawa, Japan on 5 March 2000. Only one line ("I don't believe that anybody feels the way I do about you now") in the first verse is from the actual Wembley gig, as Liam failed to sing this line correctly in the Yokohama performance.
 The audio version of the album is also missing various bits of between-track banter.

Promos
 A promo video of the Wembley version of "Gas Panic!" was distributed to music channels. The video featured visuals from throughout the gig and was slightly edited down to 6:57.
 "Gas Panic!" and "Hey Hey, My My" promo CDs were issued in Brazil to promote Oasis' appearance at the Rock in Rio festival on 14 January 2001. The 2-track CD of Gas Panic! included the album version and an edited version of the Wembley track, which was edited down to 4:28. The 1-track CD of Hey Hey, My My included the live version from Wembley.

Artwork
Each of the eight different formats (plus the 2001 highlights CD) had a different colour for its own cover art. Below is a table featuring each colour for each format

Personnel
Liam Gallagher - lead vocals, tambourine
Noel Gallagher – lead guitar, backing vocals; lead vocals on "Don't Look Back in Anger", "Hey Hey, My My", "Step Out" and "Helter Skelter"
Gem Archer - rhythm guitar
Andy Bell – bass guitar
Alan White - drums
Zeb Jameson – keyboards

Charts

Weekly charts

Year-end charts

Certifications

! colspan="3"| Album
|-

! colspan="3"| Video
|-

References

External links

Familiar to Millions at YouTube (streamed copy where licensed)

2000 live albums
2000 video albums
Live video albums
Epic Records live albums
Epic Records video albums
Live albums recorded at Wembley Stadium
Oasis (band) live albums
Big Brother Recordings live albums
Big Brother Recordings video albums
Albums produced by Paul Stacey